Tongi is a major township in Gazipur, Bangladesh, with a population of 350,000. It hosts the Biswa Ijtema and features a BSCIC industrial area, which produces BDT 1500 crore of industrial products annually, and marks the northern border of Dhaka since 1786. Tongi Shahid Smrity high School compound is mass burial site of the genocide in Liberation War of Bangladesh.

History

Mir Jumla II (1660–1663) built a fort to protect the northern entry of Dhaka during his reign as a Mughal subadar (1660–1663). The subadar also built a bridge over the river Turag. Mir Jumla constructed a road, now a part of the Dhaka-Mymensingh highway, that connected Tongi with Bag-e-Badshahi. It served as an axis of urban growth in the 19th and 20th centuries as sites for establishment of new urban settlements - Gulshan (formed in 1961), Banani (in 1964), Baridhara (in 1972) and Uttara (in 1965) -  were picked off the highlands along that axis road.

In 1786, Tongi-Jamalpur was designated as the northern boundary of Dhaka by the East India Company, reaffirmed by John Taylor, the first English Commercial Resident of Dhaka in 1800.

Geography and administration
Tongi, a thana (police station) within the Gazipur Sadar Upazila along with Joydebpur since 1983, is located immediately north of Dhaka. It lies within the jurisdiction Gazipur District, which is a part of the Dhaka Division.

Geologically, the Tongi area comprises the southern extension of the Madhupur tract, a long narrow tract of tectonically elevated area of older sediments only a few metres above the surrounding rivers the Turag. Locally, the Tract is subdivided into the Bhawal Garh terrace which is a part of an inlier, an elevated area surrounded by lowlands by very young riverine sediments occupying the surrounding valleys. The older sediment sequence consists of sandstone of the Dupi Tila Formation overlain by Madhupur Clay, which in turn is overlain by alluvium. The elevation of the Tract varies from 2 to 14 m above mean sea level and it has shallow bedrock which forms a firm substrate for supporting large structures.

Demography
Many of the people who live in Tongi commute to Dhaka each day, mainly by bus. Many people are also employed at factories in Export Processing Zones, areas given special tax and tariff exemptions by the government in order to stimulate industry.

River

Tongi has a bordering river called the Turag River, it is very actively used by the local commuters and traders. The annual Bishwa Ijtema is also held in Tongi beside the banks of Turag River.

Thana
There are two thanas in Tongi – Tongi East and Tongi West Thana.

Transport 

The newly constructed Tongi Diversion Road forms another important artery of the road network leading to Dhaka.

The Narayanganj–Dhaka–Mymensingh State railway was opened in 1885–86. Tongi has a break of gauge junction station in the same name where the new cross country line across the Jamuna Bridge from the western section joins the eastern section. Tongi is situated on the bank of the river Turag, transport boats and cargo boats are also available here.

Education 

Educational institutions in this area include:
Shilmon Abdul Hakim Master High School
 Noyagaon M A Majid Miah High School (NMAMMHS)
 Shaheed Smrity High School
 Tongi Government College
 Mozida Government High School
 Safiuddin Sarker Academy and College
 Siraj Uddin Sarker Vidya-niketon & College
 Tongi Pilot School & Girls' College
 Shahajuddin Sarker Model School & College
 Tamirul Millat Kamil Madrasah (Tongi Branch)
 Ashraf Textiles High School

Medical colleges and hospitals 

 Shaheed Ahsan Ullah Master General Hospital
 Tairunnessa Memorial Medical College & Hospital - 375 bedded hospital
 International Medical College & Hospital - 500 bedded hospital

References

External links
Gazipur District Commissioner's Official Website
UNESCAP Publication on the Geographical Engineering possibilities of the Dhaka-Tongi area
report on enhancing economic zones including the Tongi BSCIC zone by International Finance Corporation

 
Suburbs of Dhaka
Neighbourhoods in Gazipur
Gazipur Sadar Upazila